Michaëlla Krajicek was the defending champion, however she chose to participate in Dubai instead.

Olga Govortsova won the title, defeating Rebecca Šramková in the final, 6–2, 6–1.

Seeds

Main draw

Finals

Top half

Bottom half

References 
 Main draw

ITF Women's Circuit UBS Thurgau - Singles